Tome Pachovski (born 28 June 1982) is a Macedonian retired footballer who played as a goalkeeper.

Club career
Pachovski started playing with FK Pelister between 1999 and 2003. He moved to Greek side Ionikos in early 2004, after previously being linked with Serbian side FK Železnik.

Despite interest from other European teams, such as Russian team FC Terek Grozny, in the January 2008 transfer window, he remained in Rabotnički.  He was then transferred to FK Vardar in June 2008 and on 24 June 2009, Pacovski signed a two-year contract with Beerschot AC.

After three seasons with Beerschot, Pachovski signed a 3-year contract to continue his career with fellow Belgian side KV Mechelen.
In December 2014 he signed with FK Vardar.

International career
He made his senior debut for Macedonia in a June 2006 friendly match against Turkey and has earned a total of 46 caps, scoring no goals. His final international was an October 2015 European Championship qualification match against Ukraine.

Trophies
Three national titles (two with Rabotnicki and one with Vardar)

Three national titles (two with Rabotnicki and one with Pelister)

Records
 48 caps for Macedonian national team
 10 matches as captain of national team
 National record: 798 minutes unbeaten
 National record: Season 2008/09 (33 matches – conceded 11 goals)
 2007/08 – Best goalkeeper in Macedonian first league
 2008/09 – Best player in Macedonian first league

Personal life
His original name is Tome and not Tomislav which he is often called in error. The name Tome is usually a nickname from the name Tomislav, but in his case it's his real name.

References

External links
 Profile at Macedonian Football 

1982 births
Living people
Sportspeople from Bitola
Association football goalkeepers
Macedonian footballers
North Macedonia international footballers
FK Pelister players
Ionikos F.C. players
FK Rabotnički players
FK Vardar players
Beerschot A.C. players
K.V. Mechelen players
Macedonian First Football League players
Super League Greece players
Macedonian Second Football League players
Belgian Pro League players
Macedonian expatriate footballers
Expatriate footballers in Greece
Macedonian expatriate sportspeople in Greece
Expatriate footballers in Belgium
Macedonian expatriate sportspeople in Belgium